The following article lists the indebted companies in the world by total corporate debt according estimates by the British-Australian investment firm Janus Henderson. In 2019, the total debt of the 900 most indebted companies was $8,325 billion. The most indebted companies were in the oil and gas, utilities, telecommunication and automotive industries. The world's most indebted company in 2019 was Volkswagen AG.

2021 Top 20 
The 20 companies with the highest debt in 2021.

2019 Top 20 

The 20 companies with the highest debt in 2019.

2016 Top 20 

The 20 companies with the highest debt in 2016.

2014 Top 20 

The 20 companies with the highest debt in 2014.

See also 

 List of largest companies by revenue
 List of largest employers
 List of largest corporate profits and losses
 List of public corporations by market capitalization
 List of most valuable brands

References 

Debt
debt